Workin' on a Groovy Thing is a 1969 studio album containing the works of American pop singer Neil Sedaka. The album was recorded while Sedaka was touring Australia in late 1969; he recorded it on a one-off basis for the Sydney, Australia-based label Festival Records; by that time his career had slumped, and his contract had not been renewed by his former label in the USA, RCA Victor. It was recorded in Festival's studios in Sydney, Australia. It was co-produced by Sedaka and Festival house producer Pat Aulton, with John Farrar taking care of the musical arrangements. The LP featured many notable Australian session players of the period including guitarist Jimmy Doyle (later a member of jazz-rock band Ayers Rock) and veteran jazz musician John Sangster.

In the United Kingdom, the album was released on the MCA label under the title Sounds of Sedaka.

Track listing

Side one

Side two

Personnel
Neil Sedaka - vocals, piano
Alan Turnbull - drums
Len Hutchingson - bass
Jim Doyle, Mal Clarke - guitars
Mal Cunningham - piccolo & flute
John Sangster - percussion
Alan Nash, Bob McIvor - brass section leaders
Gordon Bennett, Lal Kuring - string section leaders
John Farrar - arrangements

Singles
In Australia, one single was released, "Wheeling, West Virginia", which reached No. 20 on the Australian pop chart in 1970. "The Love of a Woman" served as the B-side.

In the UK, "Ebony Angel" was released as a single, with "Puppet Man" as its B-side.

Re-issue
This album itself has not seen a re-issue since its original 1969 release, but the contents of the album are available as tracks 15-26 of the second disc of the 2002 compilation album, Let the Good Times In.

1969 albums
Neil Sedaka albums